Kelloggella is a genus of fish in the family Gobiidae, the gobies. This genus is distributed in the Indian and Pacific Oceans. The genus name honours the American entomologist Vernon Lyman Kellogg (1867-1937) of Stanford University, the discoverer of Kelloggella cardinalis.

Species
There are currently six recognized species in this genus:
 Kelloggella avaiki Tornabene, Deis & Erdmann, 2017 (Star-spangled goby) 
 Kelloggella cardinalis D. S. Jordan & Seale, 1906 (Cardinal goby)
 Kelloggella disalvoi J. E. Randall, 2009 (Disalvo's goby)
 Kelloggella oligolepis (O. P. Jenkins, 1903)
 Kelloggella quindecimfasciata (Fowler, 1946) (Central goby)
 Kelloggella tricuspidata (Herre, 1935)

References

Gobiidae
Taxa named by David Starr Jordan